Solasodine is a poisonous alkaloid chemical compound that occurs in plants of the family Solanaceae such as potatoes and tomatoes. Solasonine and solamargine are glycoalkaloid derivatives of solasodine. Solasodine is teratogenic to hamster fetuses in a dose of 1200 to 1600 mg/kg.
Literature survey reveals that solasodine has diuretic, anticancer, antifungal, cardiotonic, antispermatogenetic, antiandrogenic, immunomodulatory, antipyretic and various effects on central nervous system.

Uses 
It is commercially used as a precursor for the production of complex steroidal compounds such as contraceptive pills, via a 16-DPA intermediate.

See also 
 Solanum mauritianum

References 

Steroidal alkaloids
Plant toxins
Steroidal alkaloids found in Solanaceae
Spiro compounds